Mathnawi ( mathnawī) or masnavi is a kind of poem written in rhyming couplets, or more specifically "a poem based on independent, internally rhyming lines". Most mathnawī poems follow a meter of eleven, or occasionally ten, syllables, but had no limit in their length. Typical mathnawi poems consist of an indefinite number of couplets, with the rhyme scheme aa/bb/cc.

Mathnawī poems have been written in Persian, Arabic, Turkish, Kurdish and Urdu cultures. Certain Persian mat̲h̲nawī poems, such as Rumi's Masnavi-e Ma’navi, have had a special religious significance in Sufism.

Arabic mat̲h̲nawī
Arabic mathnawi poetry, also known as muzdawidj (literally "doubled," referring to the internal rhyme scheme of the lines), emerged and was popularized during the Abbasid era. Unlike the older poetic styles in Arabic, mathnawi verses are not monorhymes. Instead, they include an internal rhyme scheme within each bayt with an extensive use of alliteration and follow a specific meter. Arabic mathnawi (or muzdawidj) poetry is very similar to the Persian, Urdu, and Turkish equivalents, though with one major difference: most muzdawidj poems follow an aaa/bbb/ccc pattern, while the other mathnawi poems follow an aa/bb/cc pattern.

Persian masnawī
In Persian masnawī, the poems strictly adhere to a meter of 11 syllables, occasionally ten.  While the length of a masnawī is not prescribed and is therefore unlimited, most of the better known masnawī are within a range of 2,000–9,000 bayts (verses). The first known masnawī poem was written in the Sāmānid period (4th/10th century). Despite certain dates indicating a possibility otherwise, modern scholars believe it is a continuation of an Iranian verse form, not of its Arabic counterpart (there is some debate in view of the fact that the word masnawī is derived from Arabic, but most scholars believe that the Persians coined the word themselves).

Masnawī are usually associated with the didactic and romantic genres, but are not limited to them. There is a great variety among Persian masnawī, but there are several conventions that can help a reader recognize a masnawī poem. Most masnawī have a distinction between the introductory and body paragraphs (although it is not always easy to determine where that is), praise of the one God and prayers, a eulogy of the Prophet, reflections on the value of poetry, and occasionally a description of an object as a significant symbol.

Certain Persian masnawī have had a special religious significance in Sufism, such as Rumi's Masnavi-i Ma’nawi, which consists of 6 books/25,000 verses and which has been used in prayer among many Sufi's, such as the Whirling Dervishes. While some Islamic legalists find the practice unconscionable, the Sufi scholar and jurist Abu Hamid al-Ghazali supported the use of poetry as worship.

In the 21st century, Ahmad Niktalab has been one of the expert poets of Persian masnawi.

Turkish mat̲h̲nawī
Turkish mathnawi began developing in the 8th/14th century. Persian mathnawi influenced Turkish authors as many Turkish mathnawī were, at first, creative translations and adaptations of Persian mathnawī. The oldest known Turkish mathnawī is a didactic poem called Kutadgu Bilig.

Turkish mathnawī are strongly driven by their plot, and are usually categorized into three genres—mutaḳārib (heroic), ramal (religio-didactic), and hazadj (romantic).  Some mat̲h̲nawī were written with an understanding that the audience would appreciate the importance of the subject of the poem, but some were also written purely for entertainment purposes.

Mat̲h̲nawī remained prominent in Turkish literature until the end of the Ottoman Empire, when it began to transform into more conversational and rhetorical literature. Few Turkish mat̲h̲nawī have been translated into another modern language.

Urdu masnawī
Urdu masnawī are usually divided into three categories- early, middle, and late.

Early Urdu masnawī began in the 11th/17th century. In the beginning of this period, many masnawī were religious in nature, but then grew to include romantic, heroic, and even secular stories. Early Urdu masnawī were influenced by Dakkanī literature, as well as Persian mat̲h̲nawī. Because of this influence, many early Urdu masnawī were translations of Persian masnawī, although there are some original early Urdu masnawīs.

Middle Urdu masnawī became prominent in the 12th/18th century, when Urdu literature broke away from the Dakkanī tradition. In the 12th/18th century, romantic masnawī became very popular. Another new convention that appeared in middle Urdu masnawī was authors using their own personal experiences as a subject for their poem.
 
Modern Urdu masnawī began in the 13th/19th century, during a time of literary reform. Masnawī as a whole became much shorter, and the traditional meters stopped being observed. These masnawī deal more with everyday subjects, as well as providing a medium for children's poetry. A well-known masnavi-writer in Urdu in recent times was Allama Dr. Syed Ali Imam Zaidi "Gauhar Lucknavi" (great-grandson of Mir Baber Ali Anees).

See also
 Diwan (poetry)

References

Literature
 

Arabic and Central Asian poetics
Pakistani poetics

Iranian inventions
Arabic poetry forms
Literary genres
Mathnawi